Jelsnes is a village in Sarpsborg municipality, Norway. Its population is 308. Jelsnes is located in the north of Tunøya, and belonged to Tune municipality before 1992. The mayor of Sarpsborg, Sindre Martinsen-Evje, comes from Jelsnes.

References

Villages in Østfold
Sarpsborg